Zwirner is a German surname. Notable people with the surname include:

David Zwirner (born 1964), American art dealer, son of Rudolf
Ernst Friedrich Zwirner (1802–1861), German architect
Rudolf Zwirner (born 1933), German art dealer

See also
Zwiener

German-language surnames